Tomake Chai is a 2017 Indian Bengali romance film directed by Rajiv Kumar Biswas and produced by Shrikant Mohta and Mahendra Soni under the banner of Shree Venkatesh Films and Surinder Films. The film features Bonny Sengupta and Koushani Mukherjee in lead roles.  It is a remake of award-winning 2011 Kannada movie  Sanju Weds Geetha.

Story

The movie is centered around a young couple, Joy (Bonny Sengupta) and Diya (Koushani Mukherjee) who fall in love with each other in their college. Diya and Joy are madly in love with each other, but Diya who is being molested by her cousin from her childhood and  reveals it to Joy and asks him to marry her. On the day of their marriage she is again molested by her cousin and Joy kills him to save Diya and goes to jail. In course of time, Diya loses her memory and becomes pregnant and escapes from her home. Eventually she reaches to that cell of jail, where Joy was once kept. Diya dies in that jail, while Joy gets killed while escaping from the jail.

Cast

 Bonny Sengupta as Joy Ghosh
 Koushani Mukherjee as Diya Sen
 Supriyo Dutta as Layer Ajay Sen & Diya's uncle
 Biswajit Chakraborty as Diya's father
 Biswanath Basu as Joy's uncle
 Raja Dutta
 Anindo Banerjee as 
 Asim Ray Chowdhury
 Aniban Chakraborty
 Abonti Dutta
 Tonuka Chatterjee
 Sandy as Bhanu

Soundtrack

Tomake Chai contains 4 songs composed by Indradeep Dasgupta and lyrics written by Prasen (Prasenjit Mukherjee). The songs are sung by Arijit Dev, Arijit Singh, Anwesha Datta Gupta and, Madhura.

References

Bengali-language Indian films
2010s Bengali-language films
Bengali remakes of Kannada films
Indian romantic drama films
2017 romantic drama films
Films directed by Rajiv Kumar Biswas
Films scored by Indradeep Dasgupta